What Money Can't Buy is a 1917 American drama silent film directed by Lou Tellegen and starring Jack Pickford, Louise Huff, Theodore Roberts, Hobart Bosworth, Raymond Hatton and James Cruze. It was written by George Broadhurst and Beulah Marie Dix. The film was released on July 16, 1917, by Paramount Pictures.

Plot

Cast 
Jack Pickford as Dick Hale
Louise Huff as Princess Irenia
Theodore Roberts as Madison Hale
Hobart Bosworth as Govrian Texler
Raymond Hatton as King Stephen III
James Cruze as Ferdinand Vaslof
James Neill as The Cardinal
Bliss Chevalier as Countess Bonaco

References

External links 
 

1917 films
1910s English-language films
Silent American drama films
1917 drama films
Paramount Pictures films
American black-and-white films
American silent feature films
Films directed by Lou Tellegen
1910s American films